Gymnosoma philippinense is an Asian and Australasian species of fly in the family Tachinidae.

References

Phasiinae
Diptera of Asia
Diptera of Australasia
Insects described in 1928
Taxa named by Charles Henry Tyler Townsend